Medina Foundation College of Sapang Dalaga, Inc. is a private non-sectarian higher education institution run by the Medina College, Inc. in Sapang Dalaga, Misamis Occidental. It was established by Medina College, Inc. in June 1984, exactly two decades after the main campus in Ozamiz City was founded. It is among the other private schools in Misamis Occidental which accommodates higher education programs in arts, elementary and secondary education, business administration, and junior secretarial courses.

History
In the June of 1963, the first Medina College was founded in Ozamiz City by Dr. Rico Macan Medina, Sr. and his wife, Dr. Beatriz Crisostomo Medina.

The school eventually rose as one of the pioneering schools in the region particularly in the field of midwifery and nursing. Years after its establishment, the school faced unexpected growth. This led to the decision to create an expansion program, both for the purpose of accommodating the larger population and to cope with the demands of modern education.

As a result of this expansion program, a second Medina College was formed in June 1984 in Sapang Dalaga, Misamis Occidental. Since then, the school has been catering students from the province and neighboring areas in Zamboanga Peninsula and Northern Mindanao regions.

References

Education in Misamis Occidental
Universities and colleges in Misamis Occidental